Sherman Creek is a  tributary of the Susquehanna River in Perry County, Pennsylvania.

Sherman Creek joins the Susquehanna River just downstream of Duncannon. While the official name according to the United States Geological Survey Geographic Names Information System is "Sherman Creek", an officially recognized variant name is "Shermans Creek".  Most locals refer to it as the latter.

Shermans Creek is purported to be named after a Native American fur trader who lived near and drowned crossing the creek on horseback.

Bridges
Book's Covered Bridge
Dellville Covered Bridge

See also
List of rivers of Pennsylvania

References

External links
U.S. Geological Survey: PA stream gaging stations

Rivers of Pennsylvania
Tributaries of the Susquehanna River
Rivers of Perry County, Pennsylvania